Berkheya purpurea (Purple berkheya; syn. Stobaea purpurea DC.) is a perennial member of the subfamily (Arctotideae) of the family Asteraceae of flowering plants.  Like most members of its genus, Berkheya, it is native to southern Africa.

References

External links
Berkheya purpurea 

Vernonioideae